Bianca Giteau (née Franklin) is a former Australian netball player. Giteau played with the Perth Orioles in 2002, the Canberra Darters from 2003 to 2005 and the Melbourne Kestrels in 2006 in the Commonwealth Bank Trophy. She also played with the Australian U21 team from 2004 to 2005. In the ANZ Championship, Giteau played for the West Coast Fever from 2008 to 2010, and with the Adelaide Thunderbirds in 2011. 

Giteau is the older sister of Australian rules footballer Lance "Buddy" Franklin. An Indigenous Australian, she received an ATSIC award for West Australian Young Achiever of the Year in 2003 and was nominated for Female Sportsperson of the Year at The Deadlys in 2006. In May 2009 she became engaged to Australian rugby union player Matt Giteau, whom she met at the Australian Institute of Sport. The couple married in December 2010 on the Gold Coast, and have three children together, Levi, Kai and Winter.

References

1984 births
Living people
Australian netball players
Adelaide Thunderbirds players
West Coast Fever players
Melbourne Kestrels players
Indigenous Australian netball players
People from Dowerin, Western Australia
ANZ Championship players
Perth Orioles players
Netball players from Western Australia
AIS Canberra Darters players